Chorizopes is a genus of orb-weaver spiders first described by O. Pickard-Cambridge in 1871. Though it belongs to the orb weaver family, these spiders move through leaf litter preying on other spiders rather than spinning webs. The original name was "Chorizoopes", but the emendation Chorizopes by Tamerlan Thorell is now protected by usage.

Species
 it contains twenty-six species, most from India and China, with several others found in locations ranging from Madagascar to Japan:
Chorizopes albus Mi, Wang & Peng, 2016 – China
Chorizopes anjanes Tikader, 1965 – India
Chorizopes antongilensis Emerit, 1997 – Madagascar
Chorizopes calciope (Simon, 1895) – India
Chorizopes casictones Kallal & Hormiga, 2019 – Madagascar
Chorizopes congener O. Pickard-Cambridge, 1885 – India
Chorizopes dicavus Yin, Wang, Xie & Peng, 1990 – China
Chorizopes frontalis O. Pickard-Cambridge, 1871 – Sri Lanka to Indonesia (Sumatra)
Chorizopes goosus Yin, Wang, Xie & Peng, 1990 – China
Chorizopes kastoni Gajbe & Gajbe, 2004 – India
Chorizopes khandaricus Gajbe, 2005 – India
Chorizopes khanjanes Tikader, 1965 – India, China
Chorizopes khedaensis Reddy & Patel, 1993 – India
Chorizopes longus Mi, Wang & Peng, 2016 – China
Chorizopes madagascariensis Emerit, 1997 – Madagascar
Chorizopes mucronatus Simon, 1895 – Sri Lanka
Chorizopes nipponicus Yaginuma, 1963 – China, Korea, Japan
Chorizopes pateli Reddy & Patel, 1993 – India
Chorizopes quadrituberculata Roy, Sen, Saha & Raychaudhuri, 2014 – India
Chorizopes rajanpurensis Mukhtar & Tahir, 2013 – Pakistan
Chorizopes shimenensis Yin & Peng, 1994 – China
Chorizopes stoliczkae O. Pickard-Cambridge, 1885 – India
Chorizopes tikaderi Sadana & Kaur, 1974 – India
Chorizopes trimamillatus Schenkel, 1963 – China
Chorizopes tumens Yin, Wang, Xie & Peng, 1990 – China
Chorizopes zepherus Zhu & Song, 1994 – China

References

Araneidae
Araneomorphae genera
Spiders of Asia